Busted Circuits and Ringing Ears is a documentary detailing the career of Seattle-based band Tad.

References

Documentary films about heavy metal music and musicians
Tad (band) video albums
2008 video albums